Oleana “Ana” Sortun is a chef, restaurateur and author in the Boston area.

Biography
Sortun was born in Seattle.

After she graduated from La Varenne Ecole de Cuisine de Paris, she came to Massachusetts to open Moncef Meddeb’s Argo Bistro followed by stints, in the early 1990s, at 8 Holyoke and Casablanca, both in Harvard Square.  The eponymous Oleana opened in 2001.

Her husband, Chris Kurth, owns Siena Farms, named after their daughter.

Restaurants
In addition to Oleana, she opened Sofra Bakery with a partner Maura Kilpatrick in 2008. The idea behind Sofra was to have both a retail store and an "informal Middle Easter café." the farm supplies produce for Oleana. It is located in Sudbury, Massachusetts, and it is where they live.

2013 was when she partnered with Chef de Cuisine Cassie Piuma to open a Meyhane named Sarma in Somerville, Massachusetts.

Honors and awards
Sortun received the 2005 James Beard Award for Best Chef in the Northeast.

Publications
 SPICE: Flavors of the Eastern Mediterranean 2006
Soframiz: Vibrant Middle Eastern Recipes from Sofra Bakery

TV appearances
 Top Chef Masters (season 2)

References

Living people
People from Seattle
Chefs from Massachusetts
American women chefs
James Beard Foundation Award winners
People from Sudbury, Massachusetts
Cookbook writers
Year of birth missing (living people)